Castro County is a county located in the U.S. state of Texas. As of the 2020 census, its population was 7,371. Its county seat is Dimmitt. The county was named for Henri Castro, who was consul general to France for the Republic of Texas and the founder of a colony in Texas.

The county was originally created in 1876 and was organized in 1891.

Geography

Major highways
  U.S. Highway 60
  U.S. Highway 385
  State Highway 86
  State Highway 194

Adjacent counties
 Deaf Smith County (north)
 Randall County (northeast)
 Swisher County (east)
 Hale County (southeast)
 Lamb County (south)
 Parmer County (west)

Demographics

Note: the US Census treats Hispanic/Latino as an ethnic category. This table excludes Latinos from the racial categories and assigns them to a separate category. Hispanics/Latinos can be of any race.

As of the census of 2000, 8,285 people, 2,761 households, and 2,159 families were residing in the county. The population density was 9 people per square mile (4/km2). The 3,198 housing units averaged 4 per square mile (1/km2). The racial makeup of the county was 75.35% White, 2.27% African American, 1.17% Native American, 19.15% from other races, and 2.05% from two or more races.  About 51.65% of the population were Hispanic or Latino of any race.

Of the 2,761 households, 40.90% had children under 18 living with them, 65.10% were married couples living together, 8.70% had a female householder with no husband present, and 21.80% were not families. About 20.50% of all households were made up of individuals, and 10.20% had someone living alone who was 65 or older. The average household size was 2.98, and the average family size was 3.45.

In the county, the age distribution was 33.10% under 18, 9.00% from 18 to 24, 24.30% from 25 to 44, 20.90% from 45 to 64, and 12.70% who were 65 or older. The median age was 32 years. For every 100 females, there were 100.50 males. For every 100 females aged 18 and over, there were 98.20 males.

The median income for a household in the county was $30,619, and for a family was $35,422. Males had a median income of $25,379 versus $20,433 for females. The per capita income for the county was $14,457. About 15.70% of families and 19.00% of the population were below the poverty line, including 25.30% of those under age 18 and 13.90% of those age 65 or over.

Politics

Communities

Cities
 Dimmitt (county seat)
 Hart
 Nazareth

Unincorporated communities
 Hilburn
 Summerfield
 Sunnyside

Education
School districts:
 Dimmitt Independent School District
 Happy Independent School District
 Hart Independent School District
 Hereford Independent School District
 Lazbuddie Independent School District
 Nazareth Independent School District
 Springlake-Earth Independent School District

All of the county is in the service area of Amarillo College.

See also

 List of museums in the Texas Panhandle
 Recorded Texas Historic Landmarks in Castro County

References

External links
 Castro County government's website
 Castro County in Handbook of Texas Online at the University of Texas
 Interactive Texas Map
 Texas Map Collection 
 Castro County Profile from the Texas Association of Counties

 
1891 establishments in Texas
Populated places established in 1891
Texas Panhandle
Majority-minority counties in Texas